Microweisea is a genus of minute lady beetles in the family Coccinellidae. There are about six described species in Microweisea.

Species
These six species belong to the genus Microweisea:
 Microweisea coccidivora (Ashmead, 1880)
 Microweisea colombiana Gonzalez
 Microweisea minuta (Casey, 1899)
 Microweisea misella (LeConte, 1878)
 Microweisea ovalis (LeConte, 1878)
 Microweisea suturalis (Schwarz, 1904)

References

Further reading

 
 
 

Coccinellidae
Coccinellidae genera
Articles created by Qbugbot